In chromatography, resolution is a measure of the separation of two peaks of  different retention time t in a chromatogram.

Expression 
Chromatographic peak resolution is given by

where tR is the retention time and wb is the peak width at baseline. Here compound 1 elutes before compound 2.

If the peaks have the same width

.

Plate number

The theoretical plate height is given by 

where L is the column length and N the number of theoretical plates. The relation between plate number and peak width at the base is given by

.

See also
Van Deemter equation
Resolution (mass spectrometry)
Image resolution

References

External links
IUPAC Nomenclature for Chromatography